San Francisco University High School is a private college preparatory high school located in San Francisco, California. The school was opened in 1975.

Facilities and campus
The school is made up of four buildings, commonly referred to as Upper, Middle, Lower, and South campuses.

Upper Campus is the oldest and most historic part of campus. It was designed by Julia Morgan and built in 1917 to house Katherine Delmar Burke School, a girls' school, from the early part of the 20th century until 1975, when the building was sold to the newly created University High School. It houses the History and English Departments, College Counseling offices, and administrative offices. Middle Campus, connected to Upper Campus by a bridge, houses the school library; a 400-seat theater; the student center and cafeteria; state-of-the-art science labs; music rooms, including an electronic music recording room; and the Summerbridge program, UHS's pioneer program to help talented students from local public middle schools obtain the resources they might not have access to in their current schools. Lower Campus is home to the Math and Science Departments. It also holds the fitness center, changing rooms, gym, and athletic offices. Indoor sports are played at the gym, while field sports are mainly played at the nearby Paul Goode Field athletic complex. South Campus, which opened in the 2006–2007 school year, is the home of the Foreign Language Department and the Art Department. Additionally, South Campus contains a language lab, a large photography studio and darkroom, and art studios.

Incidents

There was an investigation in 2021 into improper conduct between adults and students at the high school, involving, in particular, a former girls’ soccer coach.

Notable alumni

Writers
Ethan Canin, author
Ben Casnocha, author
Vendela Vida, author

Athletes
Tyler Walker, MLB baseball player, San Francisco Giants
Eileen Gu, Olympic freestyle skier

Artists and musicians
Tauba Auerbach, artist
Slater Bradley, video artist
Ari Gold, filmmaker, actor, musician
Hollis, musician
John Morris, actor
Nicky Sanders, musician Steep Canyon Rangers
Sol Sender, graphic designer
Deke Sharon, a cappella musician, producer
Olivia Somerlyn, musician
Maury Sterling, actor
George Watsky, musician, poet, internet phenom
Erin Cressida Wilson, playwright, screenwriter, author
Ali Wong, comedian
Basil Twist, puppeteer

Business
Peter Saraf, film producer
Robert Reffkin, co-founder and CEO of Compass, Inc.
Adam Pritzker, co-founder of General Assembly, member of the Pritzker family

See also
San Francisco County high schools

References

External links

High schools in San Francisco
Educational institutions established in 1973
Private high schools in California
Preparatory schools in California
1973 establishments in California